Krzysztof Józef Tchórzewski (born 19 May 1950) is a Polish engineer and politician. He serves as the Minister of Energy in the cabinet of Beata Szydło (since 1 December 2015). Prior to this, Tchórzewski was a minister without portfolio.

Life and career 
Tchórzewski was born Rzążew. In the 1980s, he was part of the anti-communist opposition. He was the chairman of the Siedlce branch of the Solidarity from 1981. From 1990 to 1992 he was the provincial governor of the Siedlce Voivodeship. He held various significant positions in the public and private sectors, including as Deputy Transport Minister (1997-2001), Deputy Economy Minister (2005), and PKP Energetyka Economic Director (2002).

He was elected to the Sejm on September 25, 2005 getting 8516 votes in 18 Siedlce district, as a candidate on the Law and Justice list. He was also a member of Sejm 1991–1993 and Sejm 1997–2001. In 1974 he graduated from the Faculty of Electrical Engineering at the Warsaw University of Technology.

Personal life 
Tchórzewski has four children with his wife Teresa, including Karol, a councilman of the Mazovian Regional Council. Karol also ran as the PiS candidate for the President of Siedlec in 2018.

Honours 
Tchórzewski has been awarded the Silver Cross of Merit (1987), the Knight's Cross of the Order of Polonia Restituta (2001), and the Officer's Cross of the Order of Polonia Restituta (2005).

Footnotes

See also
Members of Polish Sejm 2005-2007

External links
Krzysztof Tchórzewski - parliamentary page - includes declarations of interest, voting record, and transcripts of speeches.

1950 births
Living people
People from Siedlce County
Law and Justice politicians
Members of the Polish Sejm 1991–1993
Members of the Polish Sejm 1997–2001
Members of the Polish Sejm 2005–2007
Members of the Polish Sejm 2007–2011
Members of the Polish Sejm 2011–2015
Members of the Polish Sejm 2015–2019
Members of the Polish Sejm 2019–2023
Warsaw University of Technology alumni
Government ministers of Poland
Knights of the Order of Polonia Restituta
Officers of the Order of Polonia Restituta
Recipients of the Silver Cross of Merit (Poland)
Centre Agreement politicians
Polish electrical engineers
Solidarity (Polish trade union) activists
Solidarity Electoral Action politicians